Abominable Pictures is an American creator-driven comedy production company that develops and produces content for television, web and film.

Output
Producer Jonathan Stern founded Abominable in 2006 to produce the first season of internet cult-hit Wainy Days with creator and frequent collaborator David Wain. The success of Wainy Days, which released its 40th episode in 2012, was followed by the web series Horrible People and Hot Sluts, both created by A.D. Miles, Funny or Die Presents on HBO, and Childrens Hospital, created by Rob Corddry.

Childrens Hospital became a television show on Adult Swim, where it aired seven seasons and won two Emmy awards.

Abominable has also produced three seasons of procedural-crime comedy NTSF:SD:SUV::, created by Paul Scheer, and two seasons of You’re Whole, created by Michael Ian Black, both on Adult Swim as well as two seasons of Newsreaders, a fake-newsmagazine spinoff of Childrens Hospital and the first season of Garfunkel & Oates which aired on IFC. Abominable has also produced a collection of parody infomercials for Adult Swim; the second and third sets are currently in post-production.

At the same time, Abominable has maintained an active web series slate, led by 3 seasons of the popular, Emmy-nominated Bachelor parody Burning Love for both Yahoo and E!. Abominable recently premiered The Hotwives of Orlando on Hulu to fantastic reviews. It is currently in post-production on the courtroom parody Beef for Paramount Digital. Abominable has a first-look deal with Fox for comedy projects on digital platforms.

Executive Producer Jonathan Stern's past projects as a producer include the pilot of Louie on FX and feature films Oxygen, Mexico City, Scotland, PA, The Vagina Monologues, Confess, Diggers, and David Wain's The Ten.

Filmography

Films and television

Web

References

External links
 

Mass media companies established in 2006
Television production companies of the United States